Chaource is a commune in the Aube department in north-central France.

A cheese is named after this town. See Chaource cheese.

In the Chaource parish church there is a sculpture by The Maitre de Chaource.

Population

See also
 Communes of the Aube department

References

External links

 Chaource tourism website
 Maitre de Chaource. List of major works of this sculptor

Communes of Aube
Aube communes articles needing translation from French Wikipedia